Aarón "El Shocker" Fernández (born 7 July 1987) is a retired professional Mexican footballer who last played for Celaya on loan from UANL. Fernandez began the Clausura 2017 as the 3rd string goalkeeper but due to injuries he made his senior Liga MX debut on February 4, 2017.

He was loaned out to Necaxa for the Apertura 2017 season, making his Copa MX debut against Zacatecas.

Honours

Club
Necaxa
Copa MX: Clausura 2018

References

External links

1987 births
Living people
Mexican footballers
Association football goalkeepers
Tigres UANL footballers
Club Necaxa footballers
Club Celaya footballers
Liga MX players
Ascenso MX players
Liga Premier de México players
Footballers from Mexico City